Purism is an arts movement that took place between 1918 and 1925.

Purism  may also refer to:
Purism (Spanish architecture) (1530–1560), a phase of Renaissance architecture in Spain
Purism (company), company manufacturing Librem personal computers and computer hardware
Linguistic purism, the practice of defining one variety of a language as "pure"

See also
Purismo,  a 19th-century Italian cultural movement